Oliver Norman (born Ralph Oliver Geoffrey Norman; 30 July 1911 — 26 July 1983) was an English cricketer. He was a right-handed batsman and a left-arm medium-pace bowler who played first-class cricket for Essex. He was born in Southend-on-Sea and died in Thorpe Bay.

Norman made one first-class appearance for Essex during the 1932 season in a University Match against Cambridge University. Norman put on ten runs in both innings of the match from the upper-middle order, but was not selected to play for the team again.

External links
Oliver Norman at Cricket Archive 

Norman made one first-class appearance for Essex during the 1932 season in a match against Nottinghamshire.  He batted at Number 3 and scored ten runs in each innings of the match, facing both larwood and Voce.

1911 births
1983 deaths
English cricketers
Essex cricketers
Sportspeople from Southend-on-Sea